Lyropteryx is a genus of butterflies of the family Riodinidae. Species of this genus are widespread in the tropical areas of the South America.

Description
Forewings are large, subtriangular, while the hindwings are relatively small. In most of species of this genus, the upper surface of the wings is black, with numerous longitudinal streaks of metallic blue-green colours on the outer half. The undersides are black, with the basal half spotted with purple pink and the outer half with black and white stripes.

List of species
This genus include four species:
 Lyropteryx apollonia Westwood, 1851 Brazil, Peru, Bolivia, Ecuador
 Lyropteryx diadocis Stichel, 1910 Brazil
 Lyropteryx lyra Saunders, 1859 Panama, Mexico, Colombia, Ecuador, Brazil 
 Lyropteryx terpsichore Westwood, 1851 Paraguay, Brazil

References
 Funet
 Westwood, 1851 - The genera of diurnal Lepidoptera, comprising their generic characters, a notice of their habitats and transformations, and a catalogue of the species of each genus; illustrated with 86 plates by W. C. Hewitson Gen. diurn. Lep.

External links
 Butterflies of America
 Biolib

Riodinidae
Riodinidae of South America
Butterfly genera
Taxa named by John O. Westwood